Amsterdam Affair is a 1968 British crime film directed by Gerry O'Hara and starring Wolfgang Kieling, William Marlowe, Catherine Schell and Pamela Ann Davy. The plot is about Dutch policeman Van Der Valk, who investigates a novelist who is accused of murdering his mistress. It was based on the novel Love in Amsterdam  by Nicolas Freeling.

Cast
 Wolfgang Kieling as Van Der Valk
 William Marlowe as Martin Ray
 Catherine Schell as Sophie Ray
 Pamela Ann Davy as Elsa de Charmoy
 J.A.B. Dubin-Behrmann as Eric
 Guy Deghy as Will Munch
 Lo van Hensbergen as Magistrate

References

External links
 

1968 films
1960s English-language films
Films directed by Gerry O'Hara
Films scored by John Scott (composer)
British crime films
1968 crime films
Films set in Amsterdam
Films shot in Amsterdam
1960s British films